Chaetophora is a genus in the family Byrrhidae, the pill beetles.

References

External links

Byrrhidae
Byrrhoidea genera